Chane is a genus of small minnow mayflies in the family Baetidae. There is at least one described species in Chane, C. baure.

References

Further reading

 
 
 
 
 
 

Mayflies